Lac du Crescent is a lake in Nièvre, France. At an elevation of 300 m, its surface area is 1.65 km².

Crescent